This is a list of Dutch television related events from 2011.

Events
21 January - Ben Saunders wins the first series of The Voice of Holland.
13 February - The television reality show Secret Story debuts on NET 5.
12 May - The first series of Secret Story is won by Sharon Hooijkaas.
10 June - Rochelle Perts wins the fourth series of X Factor.
16 September - 11-year-old singer Aliyah Kolf wins the fourth series of Holland's Got Talent.

Debuts

Television shows

1950s
NOS Journaal (1956–present)

1970s
Sesamstraat (1976–present)

1980s
Jeugdjournaal (1981–present)
Het Klokhuis (1988–present)

1990s
Goede tijden, slechte tijden (1990–present)

2000s
X Factor (2006–present)
Holland's Got Talent (2008–present)

2010s
The Voice of Holland (2010–present)

Ending this year

Births

Deaths

See also
2011 in the Netherlands